Senator Muhammad Talha Mahmood is a general category member of the Senate of Pakistan from Hazara Division of Khyber Pakhtunkhwa.

He graduated from Punjab University in 1984 and was elected to the Senate of Pakistan in 2006 and reelected in 2012. He is Deputy Parliamentary Leader of JUI-F (Jamiat Ulema-e-Islam Fazal Ur Rehman Group) and also leads the Senate Standing Committee for Narcotics Control and Interior. He is also a member of the Senate of Pakistan standing committees for Cabinet Secretariat and Capital Administration and Development, Petroleum and Natural Resources, Finance, Economic Affairs, Statistics, Planning, Development and Employees Welfare Fund. In March 2018 he was reelected to Senate of Pakistan and will remain member of the upper house until March 2024.

He is a member of the Senate Standing Committee on Finance, Revenue, and Economic Affairs and of the Muhammad Talha Mahmood Foundation.

References

External links
Profile of Muhammad Talha Mahmood, Senate of Pakistan.
Facebook

1962 births
Living people
Pakistani senators (14th Parliament)
Jamiat Ulema-e-Islam (F) politicians
University of the Punjab alumni